Fahud  is an airport serving the town and petroleum facility of Fahud in Oman.

The Fahud VOR-DME (Ident: FHD) and non-directional beacon (Ident: FHN) are located on the field.

See also
Transport in Oman
List of airports in Oman

References

External links
 OurAirports - Fahud Airport
 OpenStreetMap - Fahud
 FallingRain - Fahud
 

Airports in Oman